The Ptarmigan Peak Wilderness is a U.S. Wilderness Area located north of Dillion, Colorado in the Williams Fork Mountains.  The  wilderness was established in 1993 in the White River and Routt National Forests.

References

Wilderness areas of Colorado
Protected areas established in 1993
Protected areas of Summit County, Colorado
White River National Forest
Routt National Forest
1993 establishments in Colorado